The Lunga River is a river on the northern coast of Guadalcanal, Solomon Islands. It empties into Ironbottom Sound (called Savo Sound prior to World War II) at Lunga Point.

References

Guadalcanal
Rivers of the Solomon Islands